Euchalcia maria is a moth of the family Noctuidae. It is endemic of the Levant. It is found from south-eastern Turkey to Israel.

Adults are on wing from March to May. There is one generation per year.

External links
Plusiinae of Israel

Plusiinae
Insects of Turkey
Moths of the Middle East